Outhouse may refer to:

Outhouse, a small structure containing a simple toilet (North American meaning)
Any outbuilding near a dwelling e.g. a shed or barn (outside North America)
The Outhouse (venue), a former music venue outside Lawrence, Kansas, United States
The OUTHouse, a New Zealand talkshow dealing with lesbian and gay issues
The Outhouse, a Canadian television series about home improvement

People
John Outhouse, schoolteacher

See also
The Outhouse Classic, a winter race in Michigan, USA
Outhouse lily (Fritillaria camschatcensis), a kind of flower
Outhouse tipping, vandalism consisting of tipping over an outhouse or portable toilet
Barn (unit), or "outhouse", a unit of cross section area used in nuclear and particle physics
Off-color humor, aka "outhouse humor", toilet humour
Osthouse, a place in France